Carolyn McMaster is a Canadian film producer and president of CHAOS a film company.  Her most recent production is the Walter Hill western Dead for a Dollar starring Christoph Waltz, Willem Dafoe, and Rachel Brosnahan scheduled for release in 2022. Currently, in post production is Christmas by the Book starring Lindy Booth. Previous work includes the indigenous horror film Don't Say Its Name, Root of the Problem with Sergio Di Zio and Claire Rankin directed by Scott Sikma, the sci-fi thriller Parallel Minds, starring Greg Bryk and Tommie Amber Pirie, the 2016 romantic comedy Chokeslam starring Chris Marquette and Amanda Crew with wrestling icon Mick Foley. In 2013 the thriller Ferocious, Amanda Crew and Kim Coates was released.  Walk All Over Me starring Leelee Sobieski and Tricia Helfer premiered at the Toronto International Film Festival in 2008;.   McMaster has also directed numerous documentaries worldwide.

Filmography

Dead for a Dollar (2022) (Feature Film) (producer)
Christmas by the Book (2022) (Feature Film) (producer)
Don't Say Its Name (2020) (Feature Film) (producer)
Root of the Problem (2019) (Feature Film) (producer)
Parallel Minds (2019) (Feature Film) (producer)
Cowboy Culture (2017 - 2019) (Documentary Series) (producer)
Chokeslam (2016) (Feature Film) (producer)
The Caravan (2016) (Feature Documentary) (executive producer)
Ferocious (2013) (Feature Film) (producer)
Walk All Over Me (2008) (Feature Film) (producer)
Pay Dirt: Making the Unconventional Conventional (2005) (Feature Documentary) (producer)
Alberta's Oil Sands: Centuries in the Making (2005) (Straight-to-video) (producer)
On the Edge of Destruction: The Frank Slide Story (2003) (Documentary) (executive producer)
Turning Paige (2001) (Feature Film) (producer)
Manon Rheaume: The Woman Behind the Mask (2000) (Documentary) (producer)
Ghost Whales of Lancaster Sound (1996) (Feature Documentary) (executive producer/director)
Kuwait: The Aftermath (1990) (Feature Documentary) (producer/director)

References

https://calgaryherald.com/entertainment/movies/calgary-shot-root-of-the-problem-a-message-based-film-for-the-whole-family

External links

Canadian documentary film directors
Canadian documentary film producers
Canadian women film directors
Living people
Canadian women film producers
Year of birth missing (living people)
Canadian women documentary filmmakers